Jan Grot (Grotowic) was bishop of Kraków from 1326 to 1347. Initially, he was a fierce opponent of King Casimir the Great, whom he excommunicated in 1334. However, they reconciled in 1343.

References

External links 
Anna Adamska: Uwagi o itinerarium biskupa Jana Grotowica (1326-1347). "Nasza Przeszłość Vol. 84.

Bishops of Kraków
14th-century Roman Catholic bishops in Poland